Mira Spivak ( Steele; born July 12, 1934) is a former member of the Canadian Senate representing the province of Manitoba.

Born in Rivne, Ukraine (then in Poland), Spivak received a Bachelor of Arts, Honours Degree in Political Science and Philosophy from the University of Manitoba.

She was appointed to the Senate on the recommendation of then-Prime Minister Brian Mulroney in 1986 as a Progressive Conservative (PC).  She refused to join the Conservative Party of Canada when the PC Party merged with the Canadian Alliance in 2003 and subsequently left the Conservative caucus to sit in the Senate as an independent on February 3, 2004.

Spivak holds liberal views on most social issues.  She allowed her name to be used on a full-page pro-choice advertisement that ran in the Winnipeg Free Press on October 11, 1989.

In 2006, she supported Elizabeth May in her successful campaign to win the leadership of the Green Party of Canada.

Spivak retired from the Senate on July 12, 2009, upon reaching the mandatory retirement age of 75. She is the widow of Manitoba politician Sidney Spivak.

Sources

External links
 

1934 births
Living people
People from Rivne
Canadian people of Ukrainian-Jewish descent
Canadian senators from Manitoba
Progressive Conservative Party of Canada senators
Independent Canadian senators
Women members of the Senate of Canada
Women in Manitoba politics
Jewish Canadian politicians
Ukrainian emigrants to Canada
21st-century Canadian politicians
21st-century Canadian women politicians
Jewish women politicians